Michael Willett may refer to:

 Michael J. Willett (born 1989), American actor and musician
 Michael Willett (cricketer) (1933–2002), English cricketer